The OB I/B. bajnokság is the second level of ice hockey in Hungary. The league lies below the OB I bajnokság.

Teams in the 2010–11 season

 Debreceni HC
 Dunaújváros II
 MAC Népstadion 
 Tisza Volán SC

External links
 icehockey.hu

2
Hun